Steven Rice (born May 26, 1971) is a Canadian former professional ice hockey right winger who played eight seasons in the National Hockey League in the 1990s. Rice was born in Kitchener, Ontario.

Rice was drafted 20th overall by the New York Rangers in the 1989 NHL Entry Draft. Following his outstanding performance at the 1991 World Junior Hockey Championships, in which he captained Canada to the gold medal, he was considered one of the top young power forward prospects in the game. In the summer of 1991, he was sent to the Edmonton Oilers as one of the centerpieces going the other way in the trade of superstar centre Mark Messier.

His results in Edmonton would be mixed - he spent most of his first two seasons there with their AHL affiliate, but established himself as a full-time NHL player in 1993–94 scoring 17 goals. Following that season, he signed free-agent offer sheet with the Hartford Whalers, and joined the Whalers the following season when Edmonton declined to match the offer. In his three years in Hartford, he established himself as a quality role player, scoring a career high 21 goals in 1996–97. However, a nightmare campaign in 1997–98 following the franchise's move to Carolina, in which he scored just 2 goals, effectively ended his NHL career. He retired at the premature age of 27.

Rice came out of retirement in 2002, playing in the Ontario Hockey Association's Major League Hockey, for the Cambridge Hornets until 2006, and then briefly for the Brantford Blast in the same league before retiring for good in 2006.

He played 329 career NHL games, scoring 64 goals and 61 assists for 125 points.

Career statistics

External links
 

1971 births
Living people
Binghamton Rangers players
Canadian ice hockey right wingers
Cape Breton Oilers players
Carolina Hurricanes players
Edmonton Oilers players
Hartford Whalers players
Ice hockey people from Ontario
Kitchener Rangers players
National Hockey League first-round draft picks
New York Rangers draft picks
New York Rangers players
Sportspeople from Kitchener, Ontario